Nishagandhi Puraskaram or Nishagandhi award (Malayalam : നിശാഗന്ധി പുരസ്കാരം) is an annual award instituted by the Tourism Department of Kerala in India to honour personalities in the fields of music and dance . The award carries a cash prize of 1,50,000 Indian Rupees , a citation, and a statuette. It is presented annually on behalf of the Nishagandhi Dance and Music Festival, a cultural programme organized by the Tourism Department of Kerala  every year.

The seven-day long Nishagandhi festival is held in January at the Nishagandhi amphitheater near the Kanakakkunnu Palace in Trivandrum, the capital city of Kerala. The award was established in 2013 to popularise the Festival in the national and international level.

History 
Nishagandhi Puraskaram was first awarded to the classical dancer Mrinalini Sarabhai in 2013. Hindustani musician Lalith J. Rao won the award in the next year. Dr Padma Subrahmanyam, an exponent in Bharata Natyam,  won the award in 2015. Musician Ilayaraja won the award in 2016  for his contribution to the Indian film music industry.

The Governor of Kerala P. Sathasivam presented the Nishagandhi Puraskaram to Bharati Shivaji, an exponent in Mohiniyattom, in 2017. Vannadil Pudiyaveettil Dhananjayan and Shanta Dhananjayan are popularly known as Dhananjayans got Nishagandhi Puraskaram in 2018.

Laureates

References

External links 
 Kerala Tourism Department

Kerala awards
Awards established in 2013
Arts of Kerala
Indian art awards
2013 establishments in Kerala